Boldman is a surname. Notable people with the surname include:

Ellie Boldman (born 1975), American attorney and politician
Spencer Boldman (born 1992), American actor

See also
Bodman
Bollman

Surnames of German origin